New Hampshire Lady Phantoms were a W-League club based in Manchester, New Hampshire, USA, associated with the Men's USL team, the New Hampshire Phantoms. The team folded after the 2006 season.

Year-by-year

 

Women's soccer clubs in the United States
Sports in Manchester, New Hampshire
Soccer clubs in New Hampshire
Defunct USL W-League (1995–2015) teams
2003 establishments in New Hampshire
2006 disestablishments in New Hampshire
Association football clubs established in 2003
Association football clubs disestablished in 2006
Women's sports in New Hampshire